The 1880 Texas gubernatorial election was held to elect the Governor of Texas. Governor Oran Milo Roberts was re-elected to a second term in office over former Governor Edmund J. Davis.

General election

Candidates
Oran Milo Roberts, incumbent Governor (Democratic)
William H. Hamman, oil pioneer, 1878 nominee, and former Confederate brigadier general (Greenback)
Edmund J. Davis, former Governor (Republican)

Results

References

1866
Texas
1880 Texas elections